The 1952–53 Iraq FA Baghdad First Division was the fifth season of the Iraq Central FA League (the top division of football in Baghdad and its neighbouring cities from 1948 to 1973). Al-Haras Al-Malaki won their fourth consecutive league title.

References

External links
 Iraqi Football Website

Iraq Central FA League seasons
Iraq
1952 in Iraqi sport
1953 in Iraqi sport